Leyeh or Liyeh may refer to:
 Liyeh, Gilan
 Leyeh, Mazandaran

See also
 Liyeh Chak (disambiguation)